Motherland People's Party formerly Sinhalaye Mahasammatha Bhoomiputhra Pakshaya (The Great Consensus Party of the Sons of the Soil of Sinhala) is a minor Sinhala Buddhist  political party in Sri Lanka, led by Dr. Harischandra Wijayatunga. The party follows the pro-democratic political line manifested in 1992 by its leader.

In the 1994 presidential elections, Wijayatunga stood as the SMBP candidate. He polled 32,651 votes (0.43%).

References

Buddhist political parties
Nationalist parties in Sri Lanka
Political parties in Sri Lanka
1990 establishments in Sri Lanka
Political parties established in 1990
Sinhalese nationalist parties